Tommy Purcell (1921–1949) was an Irish sportsperson.  He played hurling with his local club Moycarkey–Borris and was a member of the Tipperary senior inter-county team in the 1940s.  Purcell won a set of All-Ireland and Munster winners' medals at senior level with Tipperary in 1945.

1921 births
1949 deaths
Tipperary inter-county hurlers
Moycarkey-Borris hurlers
Munster inter-provincial hurlers
All-Ireland Senior Hurling Championship winners